was a Japanese Nippon Professional Baseball infielder.

External links

1951 births
2016 deaths
Baseball people from Osaka Prefecture
Hosei University alumni
Nippon Professional Baseball infielders
Japanese baseball players
Yomiuri Giants players
Lotte Orions players
Managers of baseball teams in Japan
Chiba Lotte Marines managers